

References 

Antigua and Barbuda
Post-nominal letters
Post